Legionovia Legionowo is a Polish professional women's volleyball club, founded initially in 1957 as a section of a multi-sports club of the same name. The senior professional team is a separate legal entity to the academy and its reserve team.

Naming history
 2003-2011 LTS Legionovia Legionowo
 2011-2013 Siódemka Legionovia Legionowo
 2013-2014 Siódemka SK Bank Legionovia Legionowo
 2014-2015 SK Bank Legionovia Legionowo
 2015-2018 Legionovia Legionowo
 2018-2020 DPD Legionovia Legionowo
 2021- IŁ Capital Legionovia Legionowo

Achievements
I liga:
Winners: 2011-12
II liga: 
Winners: 2010–11, 2002–03
Runners-up: 2007–08, 2001–02
III liga: 
Winners: 1999-00
Polish Cup:
Semi-finals: 2019-20
Quarter-finals: 2018–19, 2015–16

References

External links
 - Official website

Women's volleyball teams in Poland
Legionowo County